Highland dress is the traditional, regional dress of the Highlands and Isles of Scotland. It is often characterised by tartan (plaid in North America). Specific designs of shirt, jacket, bodice and headwear may also be worn along with clan badges and other devices indicating family and heritage.

Men's highland dress typically includes a kilt or trews of his clan tartan, along with either a tartan full plaid, fly plaid, or short belted plaid. There are a number of accessories, which may include but are not limited to: a belt, sporran, sgian-dubh, knee-socks with a cuff known as kilt hose, garters, kilt pins and clan badges.

Women's highland dress is also based on the clan tartan, either that of her birth clan or, if married, that of her spouse's clan if she so chooses. Traditionally, women and girls do not wear kilts but may wear ankle-length tartan skirts, along with a colour-coordinated blouse and vest. A tartan earasaid, sash or tonnag (smaller shawl) may also be worn, usually pinned with a brooch, sometimes with a clan badge or other family or cultural motif.

Modern Highland dress

In the modern era, Scottish highland dress can be worn casually, or worn as formal wear to white tie and black tie occasions, especially at ceilidhs and weddings. Just as the black tie dress code has increased in use in England for formal events which historically may have called for white tie, so too is the black tie version of highland dress increasingly common.

The basis of all modern men's and women's highland dress starts with the tartan, either as a kilt, trews, earasaid, sash or tonnag. Tartans in Scotland are registered at the Scottish Register of Tartans in Edinburgh, a non-ministerial department and are usually aligned to a clan or branch of a clan, however tartans can also be registered exclusively for an individual or institution. For instance, the King has a personal tartan called Balmoral, while a tartan was recently registered for the Scottish Jewish community.

Historically weaponry formed a common accessory of men's highland dress, such as the Mattucashlass and the Dirk. However, due to the UK's knife laws, small Sgian-dubhs and sword shape Kilt pins are more commonly seen today.

For men's and women's shoes, Ghillies are thin, foldable turnshoes, now used mostly for indoor wear and dancing. The sole and uppers cut from one piece of leather, wrapped around the foot from the bottom, laced at the top, and seamed at the heel and toe. Ghillie brogues are thick-soled welted rand shoes. In both, the laces are wrapped around and tied firmly above the wearer's ankles so that the shoes do not get pulled off in the mud. The shoes lack tongues so the wearer's feet can dry more quickly in the typically damp Scottish weather.

Formal day wear ("Morning dress")

The Highland dress may also be worn as folk costume option at events requiring morning dress. As such, for formal day wear use it generally consists of:

Men:
Plain superfine wool or barathea black, charcoal or tweed Argyll-, Crail-, and Braemar-style kilt jacket
Belt and buckle or five- or six-button waistcoat in matching grey, putty, complementary or tartan material in matching colour
Kilt
 White shirt with turndown collar, French cuffs, and cufflinks
Long tie in a single colour or striped regimental style
 Black brogues (according to some views, brown shoes should never be worn with highland dress, although such are worn by the royals)
Tartan, Argyle, diced, or plain coloured dark hose (white and off-white hose should be avoided)
Flashes or garter ties
Day or horse hair sporran
Morning dress sgian-dubh (less intricate than for the full dress and typically made of horn or antler).

Formal evening wear ("White tie")

The traditional white-tie version of Highland dress consists of:

Men:
Formal kilt doublet in barathea or velvet. The Regulation, Montrose, Sheriffmuir and Kenmore doublets are suitable in a variety of colours. Velvet is considered to be a more formal material. The Prince Charlie jacket (coatee) is considered to be less formal, although when introduced it was to be worn with a white lace jabot. Tartan jackets are also seen.
Waistcoat in white marcella, tartan (usually to match the kilt), red or the same material as the doublet. No waistcoat is worn with the Kenmore or Montrose doublets.
Kilt with formal kilt pin
White stiff-front shirt with wing collar and white, gold, or silver studs and cufflinks for the Regulation doublet, or a white formal shirt and optional lace cuffs for the Montrose, Sheriffmuir, and Kenmore doublets
White lace jabot. A black silk or a white marcella bow tie may be worn in place of the jabot with the regulation doublet (Highland wear often includes a black bow tie even at white-tie events).
Black formal shoes or black buckle brogues
Tartan or diced kilt hose
Silk garter flashes or garter ties
Silver-mounted sporran in fur, sealskin or hair with a silver chain belt
Black, silver-mounted and jeweled sgian-dubh
Highland bonnet with badge (only worn outdoors)
Short belted plaid with silver plaid brooch (optional)
Scottish dirk (optional)

Semi-formal day wear ("Black lounge suit")

The semi-formal version of Highland dress consists of:

Men:
Black or charcoal semi-formal kilt jacket in superfine wool or barathea – Argyll-, Crail-, and Braemar-style jackets are suitable
Five- or six-button waistcoat in black, grey, putty or tartan
Kilt
White shirt with turndown collar, French cuffs, and cufflinks
Tie in a single colour
Black brogues
Tartan, argyle, diced or dark hose (white and off-white hose should be avoided)
Flashes or garter ties
Day-dress sporran with simple designs and often in black leather – however, a full dress sporran is not considered inappropriate
Day-dress sgian-dubh (less intricate than for the full dress and typically made of horn or antler)
Dirk

Semi-formal evening wear ("Black tie")

Traditionally, black tie Highland dress comprises:

Men:
Black, or other solid colour, barathea jacket with silver buttons – Regulation doublet, Prince Charlie (coatee), Brian Boru, Braemar, Argyll, and black mess jackets are suitable (there is some contention about whether the Duke of Montrose and Sheriffmuir doublets are too formal for black-tie occasions)
Black waistcoat
Kilt
White shirt with shirt studs, French or barrel cuffs, and a turndown collar (wing collars are reserved for white tie
Black bow tie 
Evening dress brogues
Tartan or diced full-dress kilt hose – off-white hose are often seen but are deplored by some, such as the late David Lumsden of Cushnie
Silk flashes or garter ties
Dress sporran with silver chain
Black, silver-mounted sgian dubh
 Highland bonnet with crest badge (only suitable outdoors)
 Miniature medals (if authorised)

Historical descriptions

In 1618, a poet from London, John Taylor, described the costume of Scottish aristocrats, lairds, and their followers and servants, dressed for hunting at Braemar. In August and September, all classes dressed in the same fashion by custom, as if equals. This included tartan stockings and jerkins, with garters of twisted straw, and a finer plaid mantle round their shoulders. They had knotted handkerchiefs at their necks and wore blue caps. Taylor said the tartan was "warm stuff of diverse colours."

Near the end of the seventeenth century, Martin Martin gave a description of traditional women's clothing in the Western Islands, the earasaid with its brooches and buckles."The ancient dress wore by the women, and which is yet wore by some of the vulgar, called arisad, is a white plaid, having a few small stripes of black, blue and red; it reached from the neck to the heels, and was tied before on the breast with a buckle of silver or brass, according to the quality of the person. I have seen some of the former of an hundred marks value; it was broad as any ordinary pewter plate, the whole curiously engraven with various animals etc. There was a lesser buckle which was wore in the middle of the larger, and above two ounces weight; it had in the centre a large piece of crystal, or some finer stone, and this was set all around with several finer stones of a lesser size. The plaid being pleated all round, was tied with a belt below the breast; the belt was of leather, and several pieces of silver intermixed with the leather like a chain. The lower end of the belt has a piece of plate about eight inches long, and three in breadth, curiously engraven; the end of which was adorned with fine stones, or pieces of red coral. They wore sleeves of scarlet cloth, closed at the end as men's vests, with gold lace round them, having plate buttons with fine stones. The head dress was a fine kerchief of linen strait (tight) about the head, hanging down the back taper-wise; a large lock of hair hangs down their cheeks above their breast, the lower end tied with a knot of ribbands."

According to the English military chaplain Thomas Morer, in 1689 Highland men wore plaids about seven or eight yards long, which covered from the neck to the knees except the right arm. Beneath the plaid they wore a waistcoat or a shirt to the same length as the drape of the plaid. These were "belted plaids." Their stockings were made of the same stuff as the plaid and their shoes were called "brocks" (brogues). Bonnets were blue or "sad" coloured. Morer noted that the fineness of the fabric varied according to the wealth and status of the man.

Scottish Lowlanders and Borderers were dressed much like the English, except both men and women also used a plaid as a cloak. The Lowland women wrapped their plaids over their heads as hoods, whereas Lowland and Border men wore a checkered maud (plaid) wrapped about their upper body. The maud, woven in a pattern known variously as Border tartan, Falkirk tartan, Shepherd's check, Shepherd's plaid and Galashiels grey, became the identifying feature of Border dress as a result of the garment's mention by fashionable Border Scots such as Walter Scott, James Hogg and Henry Scott Riddell and their wearing of it in public. Together with Robert Burns, they can be seen wearing a maud in portraits, etchings and statues.

Gallery

Notes

References

External links

The Scottish Tartans Authority - Registered Scottish Charity
Martin Martin, A description of the Western Islands of Scotland, London (1703)
Clans of the Scottish Highlands Fashion Plates from The Metropolitan Museum of Art Libraries

Scottish clothing
History of clothing
Folk costumes